The 1914 Navy Midshipmen football team represented the United States Naval Academy during the 1914 college football season. In its fourth season under head coach Douglas Legate Howard, the team compiled a 6–3 record, shut out three opponents, and defeated its opponents by a combined score of 174 to 83.

The annual Army–Navy Game was played on November 28  at Franklin Field in Philadelphia; Army

Schedule

References

Navy
Navy Midshipmen football seasons
Navy Midshipmen football